The Cape Range slider (Lerista allochira)  is a species of skink found in Western Australia.

References

Lerista
Reptiles described in 1989
Taxa named by Peter G. Kendrick